Haschbach can refer to two places in the Kusel district in Rhineland-Palatinate, Germany:
 Haschbach am Remigiusberg, a self-administering municipality
 Haschbach am Glan, a constituent community of Henschtal